The Saunders Almshouses are Grade II* listed almshouses in Flamstead, Hertfordshire, England. They date from 1669 and were built for Thomas Saunders of Beechwood Park.

References 

Grade II* listed buildings in Hertfordshire
Buildings and structures completed in 1669
Almshouses in Hertfordshire
Flamstead